Vasanth is an Indian director  well known in Tamil language films for directing films such as Keladi Kanmani (1990), Aasai (1995), Nerrukku Ner (1997),  Rhythm (2000) and Satham Podathey (2007).

Career

Vasanth began his career as a journalist and short story writer, before he began working as an assistant director to K. Balachander on 18 films including Sindhu Bhairavi and Punnagai Mannan. He made his first independent film in 1990, the critically acclaimed film Keladi Kanmani, which starred noted playback singer S. P. Balasubrahmanyam and enjoyed a 285-days-run at theatres. He next directed Nee Pathi Naan Pathi, titled after a song from his previous film, which focussed on an unwed mother's issue. The film features the song "Nivedha", becoming noted for its visualisation and its lyrics consisting of a single word. His third directorial was the thriller Aasai (1995), which became a trendsetter and high financial success that ran for more than 200 days. Produced by Mani Ratnam. as well as the feature film debut of lead actress Suvalakshmi, while Vasanth received the Tamil Nadu State Film Award for Best Director.

In 1997, Vasanth's next project, Nerrukku Ner released. Also produced by Maniratnam, the film introduced actor Sivakumar's eldest son Suriya, who played a leading role and Bollywood actress Simran alongside Vijay and Kausalya also became a commercial success and ran for 175 days.  Vasanth's subsequent project Poovellam Kettuppar (1999), also starred Suriya, pairing for the first time with Jyothika, who would later become his wife. The film is especially known as being composer Yuvan Shankar Raja's first major musical success. The following year, two of his directorial released, Appu and Rhythm. The former was appreciated for Prakash Raj's performance as a eunuch, whilst the latter is considered a classic, mainly for its theme and realism by critics and public. Rhythm told the tale of two individuals who lose their life partners in the same accident and overcome their sorrow to start a new relationship. The film's soundtrack, scored by A. R. Rahman consists of five songs, each depicting one of the five elements. Vasanth had picked Rhythm to be the film "closest to heart". Yai! Nee Romba Azhaga Irukke! (2002) was his following project, with its major attraction being the first ensemble soundtrack in Indian cinema, featuring five songs, composed by five debutant music directors but failed at the box office. In 2007, he made the thriller film Satham Podathey (2007), which was critically acclaimed but not a commercial hit. and a blockbuster at the box office, while fetching him a Tamil Nadu State Film Award for Best Storywriter. 2013 he made the romantic musical Moondru Per Moondru Kadhal, a film involving three love stories. In 2015, he began his next feature film titled Sivaranjaniyum Innum Sila Pengalum, reported to be a "pro-women film", in which he would introduce Carnatic singer Sudha Ragunathan as a music director.

During his sabbaticals from filmmaking, Vasanth has worked on several ad films, short films and documentaries as well. The short films, Thakkayin Methu Naanku Kangal(தக்கையின் மீது நான்கு கண்கள்), for which he won the National Film Award for Best Short Fiction Film at the 2005 ceremony, and the critically acclaimed Visaranai Commission, based on Sakithya Academy prize-winning novel by Sa. Kandhasami, are the other notable works in his career. He has directed more than 40 advertising films for multinational brands and co-directed the Vijay TV extravaganza Netru, Indru, Naalai along with Mani Ratnam. Besides, Vasanth has been conducting workshops, too, teaching nuances of filmmaking. His short film Sanath won the National award for the best film on social awareness, in the 64th National Film Awards, 2016. Sanath is an inspiring story of a victim of medical negligence, who initially becoming invalid, struggles and opens educational institutions where thousands can learn and become successful in life. This is his second National award.

Filmography

Web series

Voice artist

Actor
Films

Television
Kadhal Pagadai (1996) as himself (episode 6)

References

External links

Film directors from Tamil Nadu
Tamil film directors
Living people
Tamil Nadu State Film Awards winners
People from Cuddalore district
20th-century Indian film directors
21st-century Indian film directors
Tamil screenwriters
Screenwriters from Tamil Nadu
21st-century Indian male actors
Male actors in Tamil cinema
Male actors from Tamil Nadu
20th-century Indian dramatists and playwrights
21st-century Indian dramatists and playwrights
1963 births